Flareup is a 1969 American thriller film directed by James Neilson and written by Mark Rodgers. The film stars Raquel Welch, James Stacy, Luke Askew, Don Chastain, Ron Rifkin and Jean Byron. The film was released on November 10, 1969, by Metro-Goldwyn-Mayer.

Plot
Michele is a Las Vegas go-go dancer whose interference in her best friend's faltering marriage is seen by the girl's ex-husband as the cause of the couple's recent divorce. Obsessed, he shoots his former wife in public but manages to get away; Michele fears he'll be coming after her next. She gets some help from the police, but fears for her safety when the maniac continually eludes capture. Driving from Vegas to Los Angeles, Michele finds work at a club called The Losers, where she's picked up by the friendly valet. She doesn't tell him there's a lunatic after her, but he knows something's wrong. Meanwhile, the killer has just shot an elderly man and stolen his car, and is on his way to L.A. to find Michele.

Cast 
 Raquel Welch as Michele
 James Stacy as Joe Brodnek
 Luke Askew as Alan Moris
 Don Chastain as Lieutenant Manion
 Ron Rifkin as Sailor
 Jean Byron as Jerri Benton 
 Pat Delaney as Iris
 Sandra Giles as Nikki
 Kay Peters as Lee
 Joe Billings as Lloyd Seibert
 Carol-Jean Thompson as Jackie
 Mary Wilcox as Tora
 Carl Byrd as Sgt. Newcomb
 Steve Conte as Lt. Franklin
 Tom Fadden as Mr. Willows
 Michael Rougas as Dr. Connors
 David Moses as Technician
 Will J. White as Sgt. Stafford	
 Douglas Rowe as Gas Station Attendant 
 Gordon Jump as Security Guard
 Ike Williams as Policeman

Production
The film was based on an original screenplay. It was the first film by the GMF Pictures Corporation, a Getty company that was run by J. Paul Getty's son Ronald.

Filming began in March 1969 and finished in June.

In the film, Welch dances to the hit song "Suzie Q" by Creedence Clearwater Revival.

See also
 List of American films of 1969

References

External links 
 
 
 
 
 
 Review of the film at New York Times
 Review of film at Shock Cinema
 Review of film at Cinema Retro

1969 films
American thriller films
1969 thriller films
Metro-Goldwyn-Mayer films
Films directed by James Neilson
Films scored by Les Baxter
1960s English-language films
1960s American films